is a Japanese manga series written by Buronson and illustrated by Tetsuo Hara. It was serialized in Shueisha's shōnen manga magazine Weekly Shōnen Jump for 245 issues published from 1983 to 1988 and initially collected in 27 tankōbon volumes under the Jump Comics imprint. Set on a post-apocalyptic Earth after a nuclear war, the story centers on a warrior named Kenshiro, the successor of a deadly martial art known as Hokuto Shinken, which gives him the ability to kill his opponents by striking their secret vital points, which often results in an exceptionally violent and gory death. Kenshiro dedicates his life to fighting against the various gangs, bandits, and warlords who threaten the lives of the defenseless and innocent, as well as rival martial artists.

Fist of the North Star was adapted into two anime television series produced by Toei Animation, which together aired on Fuji TV and its affiliates from 1984 through 1988, comprising a combined total of 152 episodes. It has since expanded into a media franchise, including several anime films, a live-action film, OVAs, video games, and a series of spin-offs centering on other characters from the original story. It also has a number of video games and pachinko machines produced by Sega Sammy. English adaptations of the manga were published by Viz Communications as a monthly comic book, and later by Gutsoon! Entertainment as a series of colorized graphic novels, although neither translation was completed.

In October 2020, Viz Media announced that they will publish the title as a series hardcover editions starting in summer 2021. English adaptations of other Fist of the North Star media have been licensed to other companies, including the TV series and the 1986 film.

As of 2018, Fist of the North Star is among the highest-grossing media franchises in history. The manga has sold over 100 million copies, making it one of the best-selling manga series of all time. The series is considered as one of the most influential manga series of all time.

Plot

A worldwide nuclear war sometime in the 1990s has resulted in the destruction of most of civilization, turning the world into a desert wasteland. The remnants of mankind fight over whatever supply of food and uncontaminated water still remaining as the strong prey on the weak. Kenshiro is the successor to Hokuto Shinken, an ancient martial art of assassination that trains its practitioners to kill from within an opponent's body through the use of hidden meridian points. Kenshiro wishes to live his life in peace, but after he is separated from his fiancée Yuria by a jealous rival, he begins his journey to become the savior of the post-apocalyptic world, defending the weak and innocent from the many gangs and organizations that threaten their survival. Along the way, Kenshiro meets a young thief named Bat and an orphaned girl named Lin, who join him as his traveling companions and bear witnesses to Ken's many battles.

Kenshiro's many rivals and allies include the six grandmasters of Nanto Seiken, a rival assassin's art that ended splitting into two factions after the nuclear war, as well as his own "Brothers of Hokuto" who trained alongside him for the succession of Hokuto Shinken. Kenshiro's ultimate nemesis ends up becoming his eldest brother-in-training Raoh, a warrior who broke the law of Hokuto Shinken by killing his master Ryuken and refusing to surrender the succession to Kenshiro. Raoh seeks to conquer the post-apocalyptic world as a warlord under the mantle of Ken-oh, the King of the Fist, by challenging every martial artist he sees as a threat. After a long series of battles, Kenshiro emerges victorious over Raoh and it seems peace has finally come to the post-apocalyptic world, concluding the first half of the story.

The second half begins several years later after a tyrannical empire under the name of the Celestial Empress has risen to power, oppressing anyone who dares to oppose them. Kenshiro comes into action, joining the now-grown Bat and Lin under the banner of the Hokuto Army. As they fight their way into the Empire's capital city, they discover that the Empire has been taken over by the Viceroy Jakoh, a usurper who is keeping the real Celestial Empress captive in his dungeon. The Hokuto Army free the Empress and Jakoh is shortly vanquished afterward.

However, Lin is taken captive by the remnant of Jakoh's forces and is sent off to the mysterious Kingdom of Shura, a brutal land of warriors ruled by three overlords who have all mastered the ways of Hokuto Ryūken, a martial art which branched off from the same clan alongside Hokuto Shinken into the ways of darkness. Kaioh, the head of the three overlords, plans to conquer the post-apocalyptic world in the name of evil by wiping out the followers of Hokuto Shinken. Kenshiro uncovers the sealed testament of the Hokuto Shinken founder, Shuken, which holds the secret to overcoming Kaioh's ultimate technique. Kenshiro emerges victorious over Kaioh and rescues Lin, leaving her under Bat's care. During the final chapters, Kenshiro goes on a journey with Raoh's orphaned son Ryu, in order to lead him on the path to become the next Hokuto Shinken successor, encountering and battling various opponents along the way, before returning to Bat and Lin to protect them from a past enemy.

Production

Tetsuo Hara was a fan of Chinese martial artist and actor Bruce Lee as well as action manga and the Japanese action film actor Yūsaku Matsuda as a teenager in the 1970s. As he did not have a videocassette recorder at the time, he often drew manga versions of Lee and Matsuda from memory. Hara later came up with the idea of Fist of the North Star after being contacted by his editor Nobuhiko Horie, who asked him, "You want to write a manga about Chinese martial arts, right?" According to Hara, Horie suggested to him that he should draw a manga about "a martial artist who destroys his opponents by striking their acupressure points" based on Hara's aspiration to draw a manga about martial arts and his knowledge of pressure points. At the time, Hara was having trouble breaking into the market, as his first serial, The Iron Don Quijote (a manga about motocross racing), was canceled ten weeks after its debut. For the new manga, Hara combined the appearance and character traits of Bruce Lee and Yūsaku Matsuda to create the protagonist, Kenshiro. He was also inspired by the Ultraman and Tiger Mask series to create interesting enemy designs.

A prototype version of Fist of the North Star was published as a one-shot story in the April 1983 issue of Fresh Jump, which was followed by Fist of the North Star II, a second one-shot published in the June 1983 issue. Both stories were originally collected in the second tankōbon volume of The Iron Don Quijote, Hara's prior serial (although the expanded 1995 editions moves  the first part of the Fist of the North Star pilot to the first volume, leaving the second volume with just the second pilot).

The two one-shots were well received in the reader's surveys of Fresh Jump and Tetsuo Hara was commissioned to turn Fist of the North Star into a weekly series. Buronson was assigned to work with him as a writer for the serialized version. The storyline was revamped, with the 1980s present-day setting in the original version replaced by a post-apocalyptic future world, and the protagonist Kenshiro, originally a teenager framed for a crime he did not commit in Hara's prototype story, became an older and more stoic hero with a tragic past. For the new setting, Hara drew inspiration from the post-apocalyptic film Mad Max 2 (1981), the cyberpunk film Blade Runner (1982), Katsuhiro Otomo's post-apocalyptic Japanese cyberpunk manga Akira (1982), and the illustrations of artists Syd Mead and Frank Frazetta.

Buronson cited Bruce Lee and Mad Max as his two biggest influences on Fist of the North Star. He stated that Kenshiro and the martial arts were inspired by the martial artist Bruce Lee and his 1970s Hong Kong action kung fu films, while the post-apocalyptic setting was inspired by the Mad Max film series (1979 debut). Fist of the North Star was also influenced by Go Nagai's manga series Violence Jack (1973 debut), which similarly had a post-apocalyptic desert wasteland setting with biker gangs, anarchic violence, ruined buildings, innocent civilians, tribal chiefs and small abandoned villages; it has been argued that Mad Max may have also been influenced by Violence Jack. Originally, Hara and Buronson were contracted to do Fist of the North Star for a three-year run, but due to its popularity and the publisher's demand, it was extended to a five-year run.

Media

Manga

Fist of the North Star, written by Buronson and illustrated by Tetsuo Hara, premiered in Shueisha's Weekly Shōnen Jump on September 13, 1983, and was serialized until August 8, 1988, lasting 245 issues. Its chapters were collected in twenty-seven tankōbon volumes, published under Shueisha's Jump Comics imprint. During the 1990s, Shueisha reprinted the series in a fifteen-volume hardcover aizōban edition from 1991 to 1992, as well as fifteen corresponding economy-sized bunko editions from 1997 to 1998. The Fist of the North Star copyrights would be transferred over to Coamix, a company founded in June 2000 by Nobuhiko Horie after he left Shueisha. A fourteen-volume Kanzenban edition was published by Shogakukan in 2006, under the Big Comics Selection imprint, featuring the original water-colored artwork from the Weekly Shōnen Jump serialization, as well as almost all of the original opening pages that were omitted in earlier editions, although it lacked the added artwork featured in previous collected editions that were drawn to replace ad spaces. To celebrate the series' 30th anniversary, Tokuma Shoten re-published the series in an "Ultimate Edition", comprising eighteen volumes that were published from September 20, 2013 to July 19, 2014. This edition features new cover illustrations by Hara and include an additional chapter in the 11th volume (see below).

English translations
In 1989, Viz Communications published the first sixteen chapters of Fist of the North Star in English as an eight-issue monthly comic. These were later reprinted in a single graphic novel collection in 1995. During the same year, Viz resumed publication of the series as a monthly comic until 1997, lasting eighteen issues (adapting chapters 17–44), divided into three parts. This second run was subsequently republished in three additional graphic novel volumes titled Night of the Jackal, Southern Cross and Blood Brothers. Viz's version featured mirrored artwork with translated sound effects and other retouched details.

In 2002, a second English adaptation was published by Gutsoon! Entertainment under the title of Fist of the North Star: Master Edition, which retained the original right-to-left orientation but featured digitally colored artwork. Each volume from the fourth one and onward featured new cover illustrations by Hara that were made specifically for the Master Edition. The Master Edition ceased publication only a year after its start in 2003, lasting only nine volumes due to Gutsoon!'s withdrawal from the North American market. These colorized editions were translated back to the Japanese market, but only four volumes were published.

In 2020, Viz Media announced a print and digital publication of the manga in hardcover editions, adapted from the 2013 ultimate editions. The first volume was released on June 15, 2021.

Follow-ups and spinoffs
Fist of the Blue Sky (Sōten no Ken), a prequel to Fist of the North Star written by Nobuhiko Horie and drawn by Hara with supervision by Buronson, began publication in the premiere issue of Weekly Comic Bunch (dated May 29, 2001), a manga anthology published by Shinchosha and edited by Coamix. The title ran during the entirety of the magazine's run, initially as a regular feature and later as a semi-regular, until it ceased publication with issue #445 (dated September 10, 2010). During this period various Fist of the North Star spinoffs by different authors were also serialized in the magazine (see Hokuto Gaiden), each focusing on a different character from the original manga. The first of these, Ten no Haoh by Yowkow Osada, began publication in Comic Bunch #231 (cover dated March 24, 2006).  It was followed by Sōkoku no Garō by Yasuyuki Nekoi on Comic Bunch #286 (May 11–18, 2007),  Shirogane no Seija by Yuka Nagate on Comic Bunch #301 (September 7, 2007), Gokuaku no Hana by Sin-ichi Hiromoto on Comic Bunch #366 (January 16–21, 2009) and Hōkō no Kumo by Missile Kakurai on Comic Bunch #414 (January 22, 2010). Jibo no Hoshi by Akimi Kasai, a spinoff focused on Yuria was also published as a limited series on Big Comic Superior for three issues in 2006, with a second run that lasted six issues in 2007.

In 2014, Buronson and Hara reunited to commemorate the 30th anniversary of the manga by producing a special two-part story for Coamix's subsequent manga anthology Monthly Comic Zenon. Titled Hokuto no Ken: Last Piece, it is set during the timeline gap between Chapters 136 and 137 of the original manga and focuses on Kokuoh, Raoh's former steed who ends up becoming Kenshiro's. The first part was published in the May 2014 issue of Comic Zenon, and the second part in the following issue. It was later included as an extra chapter in Vol. 11 of the Ultimate Edition of the original manga. Other Hokuto no Ken titles published on Comic Zenon include DD Hokuto no Ken by Kajio, which started on the magazine's premiere issue (dated December 2010), Kin'yoku no Garuda, a side-story which started on Comic Zenon #29 (April 2013) and the currently ongoing Sōten no Ken: Regenesis, a sequel to the original Sōten no Ken manga drawn by Hideki Tsuji and written by Hiroyuki Yatsu which began serialization in Comic Zenon #85 (December 2017). Hokuto no Ken: Ichigo Aji written by Yūshi Kawata and illustrated by Yukito the Younger, began serialization in 2013 on Coamix's online manga anthology Web Comic Zenyon.

Dedicated e-reader
In 2018, a dedicated e-reader was sold which shipped with 18 volumes of Fist of the North Star, without the option of loading anything else on to it. It has two screens that fold out like a book and sold for ¥30,000 in Japan. The read-only device is called an eOneBook and is powered by removable AAA batteries.

Anime

TV series

Fist of the North Star was first adapted into an anime television series by Toei Animation. It aired on Fuji Television from October 11, 1984, to March 5, 1987, lasting 109 episodes. It was immediately followed by a sequel series, titled Fist of the North Star 2, which aired from March 13, 1987 to February 18, 1988, lasting for 43 additional episodes (a combined total of 152 episodes between both series).

The full series was never released on VHS in Japan, although three-hour-long compilation movies were produced by Toei Video covering the first, second and fourth story arcs in that order. On July 24, 2002, Universal Music released a Region 2 DVD box set containing all 152 episodes spread across 26 discs. These discs were later released as individual volumes from May 21, 2003 through January 21, 2004. Three "best of" DVD compilations were also released in 2005, each featuring seven key episodes from the series. On March 28, 2008, Avex released a 25th-anniversary edition box set featuring new video transfers of all 152 episodes remastered in high definition, once again spread across 26 discs. This set also features two additional discs of bonus content (including the aforementioned compilation movies).

This show aired with English subtitles on Nippon Golden Network in the late 1980s. The first 36 episodes of the first series were translated and dubbed by Manga Entertainment in 1999, although only 24 episodes were released on VHS (spread across eight tapes). All 36 episodes of the dub version were aired on Showtime Beyond in the United States and on Sci-Fi Channel in the United Kingdom, and were later released on DVD in 2003 (spread across six individual volumes). In 2008, the US subsidiary of Toei Animation produced an official subtitle-only translation of all 152 episodes, which were released on various paid download and streaming websites available only for North American customers. Discotek Media announced on October 2, 2009 that they have licensed the entire Fist of the North Star TV series. The first two boxsets were released in that year, and the latter two in 2011. The episodes use the same transfers from the 2008 DVD box set in Japan, although it did not contain any of the special features. The first set featured the first 36 episodes along with Manga Entertainment's English dub, and a Japanese audio option with English subtitles; these subtitles were adjusted from the translation of Toei's streaming episodes. Discotek later released all discs from all four boxsets (a total of 21 discs) together in one set, Fist of the North Star: The Series - The Complete Series Collection, on March 25, 2014. Discotek released the complete series as a standard definition Blu-ray set on October 31, 2017.

In 2009, William Winckler Productions produced six compilation movies voiced in English. The movies cover major story arcs from the TV series, each one centering on a specific character (Shin, Rei, Toki, Souzer, Raoh, and Kaioh). These compilation movies had not been officially released in North America and Europe yet but were distributed to video streaming websites in Japan in 2012.

Films and OVAs
The first animated feature film based on the series, simply titled Fist of the North Star, was produced by Toei Animation, which premiered in Japan on March 8, 1986. Produced by the same staff and cast who worked on the TV series, the movie adapts the storyline of the manga from the beginning and up to Kenshiro's first fight with Raoh, taking several liberties with the order of events and how the story unfolds. An English-dubbed version produced by Streamline Pictures was first released in 1991 in North America and in 1994 in Europe and Australia by Manga Entertainment.

In 2003, a three-episode original video animation (OVA) mini-series titled New Fist of the North Star was produced by OB Planning, based on a 1996 Fist of the North Star novel, Jubaku no Machi. An English dub version was produced by ADV Films in 2004.

In 2005, North Stars Pictures and TMS Entertainment announced the development of a five-part film series titled Fist of the North Star: The Legends of the True Savior. The series is composed of three theatrical films and two OVAs, which were released during a three-year period between 2006 throughout 2008, culminating with the 25th anniversary of the franchise.

At the Japanese box office, Fist of the North Star (1986) grossed  and Legend of Raoh: Chapter of Death in Love (2006) grossed , for a combined .

Novels
An original novel was written by Buronson and Tetsuo Hara titled Shōsetsu Hokuto no Ken: Jubaku no Machi which was published by Jump Novel in Japan on December 13, 1996. The novel was the basis of the later three-episode OVA series New Fist of the North Star. A novelization of the movie Legend of Raoh: Chapter of Love in Death written by Eiichi Sakaki was published by Tokuma Novels on March 10, 2006.

There have also been two cell phone novels released via the mobile site Hokuto no Ken DX. Raoh Gaiden, a novelization of the manga of the same name, and Kenshiro Gaiden, an original novel by Jotaro Higashi.

Live-action film

An American-produced live-action movie version of Fist of the North Star was released in 1995, directed by Tony Randel based on a script by Peter Atkins and Wynne McLaughlin. The movie, loosely based on the Shin storyline of the manga, stars Gary Daniels as Kenshiro, Costas Mandylor as Shin and Japanese actress Isako Washio as Yuria, with Malcolm McDowell as Ryuken and Chris Penn as "Jackal" (actually a renamed Jagi). It also featured a cameo by professional wrestler Big Van Vader as Goliath, and Kevin Arbouet as "Rao" (unrelated to the actual Raoh from the manga). The movie was released straight-to-video in the United States and Japan (though it did receive a premiere on HBO). The Japanese dubbed version used the original voice actors from the 1980s anime series.

Stage musical
A stage musical adaptation of Fist of the North Star premiered at Nissay Theatre in December 2021, with tours across Japan in 2022 and China in 2023. It is a co-production of Horipro, Hakuhodo DY Music & Pictures, and Shanghai-based theatre performance firm Ranspace, in collaboration with Coamix. The musical is directed by Sachiko Ishimaru, with script and lyrics by Ako Takahashi, music by Frank Wildhorn, and choreography by Jasmine Chiu. It features Yūsuke Ōnuki as Kenshiro, Ayaka Hirahara and May'n as Yuria, Takuya Uehara and Kandai Ueda as Shin, Kazuki Katō, Ryūnosuke Onoda, and Ryōsei Konishi as Toki, Shōichi Fukui and Masaru Nagai as Raoh, Tatsuya Kawaguchi and Hiroaki Miyakawa as Ryuken, Rena Yamazaki and Manaka Kuwabara as Rin, Ao Watanabe as Bat, Ryōsuke Miura as Rei, Kanata Irei and Rio Uehara alternating as Rei and Juza, and Miisha Shimizu as Mamiya.

Video games

Numerous video game titles based on the Fist of the North Star have been produced since the 1986 release of the Enix adventure game, simply titled Hokuto no Ken for the PC-88. The earlier games in the franchise were released by Sega for the Mark III and Mega Drive and by Toei Animation for Nintendo's Famicom, Game Boy and Super Famicom. These titles included side-scrolling action games, role-playing video games and competitive-style fighting games. The two Sega titles were stripped of the license and rebranded for the international market under the titles of Black Belt for the Master System and Last Battle for the Sega Genesis. Two Toei titles, namely Fist of the North Star (a localized version of the Famicom's Hokuto no Ken 2) for the NES released by Taxan Soft in 1989 and Fist of the North Star: 10 Big Brawls for the King of Universe for the Game Boy released by Electro Brain in 1991, had American releases with the license intact.

Further games were released for the Sega Saturn, PlayStation, PlayStation 2 and Nintendo DS, among other platforms. In 2000, Konami released an arcade game based on the franchise titled Fighting Mania. Another arcade game, a 2D fighting game simply titled Fist of the North Star, was produced by Sega and Arc System Works in 2005. Both of these games saw international distributions, although the PS2 version of the fighting game was released exclusively in Japan. Tecmo Koei produced a Dynasty Warriors spin-off focusing on the events from the first half of the manga, titled Fist of the North Star: Ken's Rage, for the PlayStation 3. It which was released in Japan, North America, and Europe in 2010. A sequel, Fist of the North Star: Ken's Rage 2, expanded on the first game and incorporated the events from the second half of the manga. It was released in Japan in 2012 and in North America in 2013. Sega's new game, Fist of the North Star: Lost Paradise was released for the PlayStation 4 in 2018. It was developed by the team behind the Yakuza series, featuring similar gameplay and elements, though rather than adapting the story of the manga, it is an original story with no continuity with events in the manga, though it does feature characters from the manga, voiced by actors from the Yakuza series. A Fist of the North Star version of Fitness Boxing for Nintendo Switch was released in Japan on December 22, 2022, and was released in the West on March 2, 2023.

Reception and legacy
Fist of the North Star was one of Weekly Shōnen Jumps most popular titles during the 1980s. It is one of the best-selling manga series in history, with over 100 million copies sold worldwide (over 60 million copies in circulation in Japan). In a poll conducted by TV Asahi in 2005 where it broadcast a popularity poll based on a nationwide survey, the Fist of the North Star anime series ranked 26th in a list of Top 100 anime TV series. In a second poll in 2006 where TV Asahi published a list of Top 100 favorite anime series, it ranked 89th. In a celebrity version of the poll, the series ranked 15th. In November 2014, readers of Da Vinci magazine voted Fist of the North Star the eighth Weekly Shōnen Jumps greatest manga series of all time. On TV Asahi's Manga Sōsenkyo 2021 poll, in which 150,000 people voted for their top 100 manga series, Fist of the North Star ranked 22nd.

Impact
Fist of the North Star is considered one of the most influential manga series of all time. Geek.com called it "an epochal, generation-defining work that introduced madcap ultraviolence to the page and inspired tons of other manga artists". Berserk creator Kentaro Miura named Fist of the North Star as the work that had the biggest impact on his own. Vinland Saga author Makoto Yukimura was first inspired to become a manga artist after reading the series as a boy.

It also had an influence on video games. Technōs Japan game designer Yoshihisa Kishimoto cited it as an influence on the setting and art style of arcade beat 'em up game Double Dragon (1987), which had a disaster-ridden city inspired by both Mad Max and Fist of the North Star. It has also been credited with originating the fatality finishing move concept which later appeared in the Mortal Kombat series of fighting games.

Internet memes
In the 2010s, Kenshiro's catchphrase "Omae Wa Mou Shindeiru" ("You Are Already Dead") became one of the most popular anime-based Internet memes. In September 2017, music producer deadman 死人 (Noah Ryan Murphy) released the song "Omae Wa Mou" which references the meme and samples the Japanese song "Tiny Little Adiantum" (2013) from the Touhou Project video game music album Toho Bossa Nova 2. The rapper Lil Boom produced his own version of the song called "Already Dead" three months later. In 2019, "Omae Wa Mou" went viral on TikTok and topped Spotify's Viral 50 chart, before being taken off the chart after being struck with a copyright claim.

Pachinko
A number of pachinko and pachislot machines based on the franchise have been produced, mainly by Sega Sammy Holdings since the launch of the CR Hokuto No Ken pachinko machine in 2002. Pachislot Hokuto No Ken, launched in 2004, sold 620,000 units by March 2005, becoming the best-selling pachislot machine. Pachinko CR Hokuto No Ken 3 became Sega Sammy's best-selling pachinko machine when it launched in 2009. By March 2017, Sega Sammy had sold 3.18million Hokuto no Ken pachinko, pachislot and arcade machines, including 2.71million Hokuto no Ken pachinko and pachislot machines, 30,000 Hokuto no Ken arcade game machines, and 440,000 Souten no Ken pachinko and pachislot machines. These pachinko machines can be seen and played in the Yakuza video game series.

See also

 Bruceploitation

Explanatory notes

Citations

General bibliography

External links
 Shin Kyuseishu Densetsu - Hokuto no Ken official website 
 Toei Animation's official Seikimatsu Kyūseishu Densetsu: Hokuto no Ken website 
 

Fist of the North Star
1983 manga
1984 anime television series debuts
1987 anime television series debuts
ADV Films
Adventure anime and manga
Anime series based on manga
Bruceploitation
Discotek Media
Fiction set in the 1990s
Fuji TV original programming
Funimation
Manga adapted into films
Martial arts anime and manga
Post-apocalyptic anime and manga
Sega Sammy Holdings
Shōnen manga
Shueisha franchises
Shueisha manga
Toei Animation television
Viz Media manga